Echium rosulatum is a species of flowering plant in the family Boraginaceae. It is endemic to the western Iberian Peninsula in Portugal, Galicia (Spain) and the Sierra Morena. It favors acidic and somewhat nitrified soil. It has two subspecies, one native to mainland Iberia and the other one (subsp. davaei) native to the Berlengas archipelago.

Description
Echium rosulatum is a perennial and generally multi-stemmed plant with decumbent or ascending stems. Leaves are partly to fully sericeous with scant indumentum, few setae and short hairs. The basal leaves are elliptic or oblanceolate, they form a rosette and have a slightly marked petiole. The stem leaves range from oblong or elliptic in the middle, to narrowly ovate or ovate-lanceolate in the upper portion.

Inflorescence
The inflorescence is panicled, loose, with cymes around 13 cm (up to 18 cm (5.1 to 7.1 in)) when fruiting. Flowers are zygomorphic. The bracts are ovate-lanceolate and are longer than the calyx. Three to four stamens (two in certain cases) are exerted from the corolla. The stamens' filaments are whitish and sparsely hairy. At least two of the ovoid, bluish-brown anthers are exerted. The style is hairy and longer than the corolla.

References

rosulatum
Endemic flora of the Iberian Peninsula